Yobaín Municipality (In the Yucatec Maya Language: “above crocodiles”) is one of the 106 municipalities in the Mexican state of Yucatán containing  (81.75 km2) of land and located roughly 70 km northeast of the city of Mérida.

History
Before the arrival of the Spanish, the area belonged to the chieftainship of Ah Kin Chel. After the conquest the area became part of the encomienda system. Between 1545 and 1555 the Spanish founded this town and established Don Galiano as one of the first encomenderos.

Yucatán declared its independence from the Spanish Crown in 1821 and in 1825, the area was assigned to the Temax Municipality. It was designated as its own municipality in 1918.

Governance
The municipal president is elected for a three-year term. The town council has four councilpersons, who serve as Secretary and councilors of culture, public works, and nomenclature.

Communities
The head of the municipality is Yobaín, Yucatán.  The other populated areas of the municipality include Chabihau, Chántul, Chúmhabim, Kayac, Santa Ana, Santa Ursula, and Tzémul . The significant populations are shown below:

Local festivals
Every year on 10 August the town holds a celebration for its patron saint, San Lorenzo.

Tourist attractions
 Church of San Lorenzo, built in the seventeenth century and restored around 1914

References

Municipalities of Yucatán